Arbelodes sebelensis is a moth in the family Metarbelidae. It is found in south-eastern Botswana and possibly extends eastwards into South Africa. The habitat consists of legume-dominated savanna.

The length of the forewings is about 11 mm. The forewings are pale olive-buff mixed with light brownish-olive scales. There is a broad band of light brownish olive at the hindwings, which becomes white and ivory yellow towards the base.

Etymology
The species name refers to Sebele, the type locality.

References

Natural History Museum Lepidoptera generic names catalog

Moths described in 2010
Metarbelinae